The 2004 Potters Holidays World Indoor Bowls Championship  was held at Potters Leisure Resort, Hopton on Sea, Great Yarmouth, England, from 05-25 January 2004.

An inaugural event was introduced for mixed pairs.

Winners

Draw and results

Men's singles

Finals

Top half

Bottom half

Women's singles

Men's Pairs

+ Wynne Richards replaced the injured Les Gillett

Mixed Pairs

References

External links
Official website

World Indoor Bowls Championship
2004 in bowls